Ambar La Fox (born Amanda Lasausse; 1935 in Buenos Aires – December 8, 1993), was an Argentine actress, dancer, singer and Diva. In 1977, she starred in the theatre show “Chicago” with Nelida Lobato.  She also was known as a film actress, and for musical shows on television.

Her daughter Reina Reech has inherited her artistic natural vocation (also from her father the acrobat “Alejandro Maurin”).  Reina is currently part of the cast of several movies, television and theatre shows.

Most of her filming career was in adult-oriented comedies, acting opposite Alberto Olmedo, Jorge Porcel.

Ambar La Fox movies

External links 
 

1935 births
1993 deaths
Actresses from Buenos Aires
Argentine film actresses
Argentine stage actresses
Argentine television personalities
Women television personalities
20th-century Argentine actresses